Eva Laky is a Hungarian sprint canoer who competed in the mid to late 1990s. She won three medals at the ICF Canoe Sprint World Championships with two golds (K-2 200 m and K-4 200 m: both 1994) and a bronze (K-2 200 m: 1999).

References

Hungarian female canoeists
Living people
Year of birth missing (living people)
ICF Canoe Sprint World Championships medalists in kayak
20th-century Hungarian women